Uê Kédadji is an electoral coalition in São Tomé and Príncipe.

Member parties
Democratic Renovation Party
National Union for Democracy and Progress
Opposition Democratic Coalition
People's Party of Progress
Social Renewal Party – joined in early 2006.

The Independent Democratic Action (ADI) party, which was part of the coalition in the 2002 election, left and decided to contest the 2006 election independently.

2002 election
In the legislative election held on 3 March 2002, Uê Kédadji won 16.2% of the vote and 8 of 55 seats in the National Assembly.

2006 election
In the legislative election held on 26 March 2006, the coalition failed to win any seats in the National Assembly.

Political parties in São Tomé and Príncipe